Rapopo Airfield was an aerodrome located at Lesson Point, Blanche Bay near Rabaul, East New Britain, Papua New Guinea. The airfield was constructed by the Imperial Japanese during World War II in December 1942. Rapopo was later neutralized by Allied air bombing from 1944. The airfield was abandoned after the cessation of hostilities.

Japanese Units based at Rapopo Airfield
14th Sentai (Ki-21 Sally)
20th Dokuritsu Hiko Chutai (Ki-21, Ki-49 Helen)

References

External links
http://www.pacificwrecks.com/airfields/png/rapopo/index.html

Transport in Papua New Guinea
Airports in Papua New Guinea
East New Britain Province